Michelle Williams may refer to:
 Michelle Ann Williams (born circa 1965), American public health scholar
 Michelle Williams (singer) (born 1979), American singer, previously a member of Destiny's Child
 Michelle Williams (actress) (born 1980), American actress
 Michelle Toro (born 1991), Canadian swimmer; née Michelle Williams

See also
 Michelle Wie, professional golfer
 Michele Wiles, ballet dancer
 Michelle Willis, singer and songwriter